Hotel Transylvania: The Series is an animated comedy television series produced by Sony Pictures Animation and Nelvana in association with Corus Entertainment. It is based on and serves as a prequel to the film Hotel Transylvania (2012), taking place in 2008, four years before the events of the first film, focusing on the activities of 114/115-year-old Mavis and her best friends at the Hotel Transylvania while Dracula is away at the Vampire Council.

The 26-episode first season premiered on June 25, 2017, on Disney Channel in the United States, with the first episode released earlier on June 20, 2017, on the WATCH Disney Channel app, YouTube, and VOD. The last eight episodes of the first season were first streamed onto Netflix in the United States on June 25, 2018, prior to their television air dates. In Canada, the series premiered October 2, 2017, on Teletoon.

On September 12, 2018, a second season was announced. The second season premiered on October 8, 2019, and ended being cancelled October 29, 2020.

The series has currently not been released on DVD or any home media format.

Series overview

Episodes

Shorts

These shorts were released through WATCH Disney Channel and Disney Channel's YouTube, they also sometimes air on Disney Channel during commercial breaks.

Season 1 (2017–18)

Season 2 (2019–20)

Notes

References

Lists of American children's animated television series episodes
Lists of Canadian children's animated television series episodes